Novgorodskaya is a rural locality (a village) in Tarnogskoye Rural Settlement, Tarnogsky District, Vologda Oblast, Russia. The population was 26 as of 2002.

Geography 
Novgorodskaya is located 6 km northwest of Tarnogsky Gorodok (the district's administrative centre) by road. Demidovskaya is the nearest rural locality.

References 

Rural localities in Tarnogsky District